Hoseynabad-e Khankowr (also Romanized as Ḩoseynābād-e Khānḵowr; also known as Ḩoseynābād and Khāneh Kūr) is a village in Daman Kuh Rural District, in the Central District of Esfarayen County, North Khorasan Province, Iran. At the 2006 census, its population was 85, in 22 families.

References 

Populated places in Esfarayen County